Ma Vie Dans La Tienne is the twelfth studio album by singer Lara Fabian. The album was released November 6, 2015.

Track listing

Charts

References

Lara Fabian albums
2015 albums
Warner Music France albums